The Loss Adjuster is a 2020 Christmas romantic comedy film written by Jayney Mackie and directed by Vincent Woods and starring Luke Goss, Martin Kemp, Kym Marsh and Joan Collins. It was released on 1 December 2020.

Synopsis
The film depicts an unlucky insurance man and the variety of clients that he visits.

Cast

Production
Filming for The Loss Adjuster began in October 2019. The primary cast, consisting of Luke Goss, Joan Collins, Martin Kemp, Guy Siner and Kym Marsh, was announced on 24 February 2020. The film's official trailer was released on 16 October 2020.

Music
The theme song for the film was sung by Beverley Knight, entitled A Christmas Wish. It was released as a single on 11 November 2020.

Release
The Loss Adjuster was released on 1 December 2020 in UK cinemas by Minerva Pictures. It was also released on DVD and online to stream on Amazon Prime, Sky Store and Rakuten TV on the same day.

Reception
The film has a score of 44% on Rotten Tomatoes. Although the film garnered attention due to its high-profile cast, it received generally negative reviews. Ben Abraham of Letterboxd said that The Loss Adjuster was a "boring and empty low budget Christmas film" as well as criticising it for being "poorly constructed both narratively and technically, filled with woefully shoddy editing [...] making it a very tough film to engage with". Kat Halstead of Common Sense Media was a little more sympathetic saying that despite several uses of mild language, "..many of the situations in the movie are serious [but] there are some warm and funny moments to lighten the tone". Despite this, The Loss Adjuster toured cinema festivals worldwide where it picked up awards including Best Feature Film at both the New York Movie Awards and the Florence Film Awards while Joan Collins won Best Lead Actress at the East Europe International Film Festival and Franz Pagot won Best Cinematography in a Feature Film, while Luke Goss and Cathy Tyson were nominated for Best Lead Actor and Best Supporting Actress respectively at the same awards.

See also
 List of Christmas films

References

External links
 

2020 films
2020 romantic comedy films
British romantic comedy films
2020s Christmas comedy films
2020s English-language films
2020s British films